JJK may refer to:

JJK Jyväskylä, a Finnish football team from the city of Jyväskylä
John "Julius" Knight, American musician
Jesper Kyd, Danish video game composer
Jacqueline "Jackie" Joyner-Kersee, American former heptathlon athlete
Jujutsu Kaisen, a Japanese manga series by Gege Akutami
Jeon Jungkook, the lead singer of K-pop group BTS